Stereo Styles by Lorna Simpson consists of ten instant film pictures placed on engraved plastic. This piece was created in 1988 and is currently located in a private collection. The ten individual images focus exclusively on the back of a young black woman’s head. Each image, all shot in black and white, shows the young woman modeling different hairstyles that would have been popular in the era. Accompanying these ten photos is ten descriptive words placed on a thin black strip, written in white cursive that read: ‘Daring,’ ‘Sensible,’ ‘Severe,’ ‘Long and Silky,’ ‘Boyish,’ ‘Ageless,’ ‘Silly, ‘Magnetic,’ ‘Country Fresh,’ and ‘Sweet.’ Simpson has added more depth and emotion to this piece by creating a drop shadow under each individual photograph.

Artist background
Lorna Simpson is a feminist photographer from Brooklyn, New York whose subject matter solely focuses on young African American women. Simpson’s works convey political messages that touch the controversial subjects of racism and sexism in modern America. She is noted for her tendency to not put a face to her subject, eliminating the documentary genre that her work is otherwise described as. To take it one step further she adds either empowering or degrading words to complement the photos. This technique is referred to as an anti-portrait, an artwork that simultaneously engages with and resists traditional portraiture. Her practices are meant to convey powerful messages, to “allude to grapple with portraits of the past [and] to reimagine black women’s places in the visual dimensions of the American symbolic order.”

Advertisement and personality
Simpson is successful in creating a powerful piece out of Stereo Styles from the seriousness of the black and white to the undertone of sarcasm in the descriptive words written in the center. Through her layout and representation of the young woman in the ten photos, the principles of cosmetic advertising of the 1980s can be used as a reference of influence. Similar to lipstick layouts, where the names of the specific colors of lipstick are written under each individual tube. By using the advertisement format her piece transforms simple hairstyles into individual personalities through the use of photography and descriptive words. However, where advertisement's product names are specific to one subject, Simpson's work does not provide a specific photo to a matching word. In this way, the viewer is able to form their own opinion of what hair style expresses the adjective best.

Chronology of physical treatment
It is also thought that the ten different hairstyles represent a chronology that correlates to changes in physical condition and treatment. This layout is important to note particularly because black women were not being used in advertisement, especially for the hairstyles or personality traits that made them unique. Similarly, the public was not avidly following the African American movement, making the transformation of hairstyles a message to society that things are beginning to change. Through both the transformative hairstyles and playful descriptors, a suggestion of black women’s efforts to make it in the professional work world shines through. This piece is meant to empower young black women to succeed in modern America but also emphasizes the presence of racial controversies that need to be made aware of.

Notes

References
Lamm, Kimberly. "Portraits of the Past, Imagined Now." In Unmaking Race, Remaking Soul: Transformative Aesthetics and the Practice of Freedom, 122-124, 2008.
Smith, Cherise. “Fragmented Documents: Works by Lorna Simpson, Carrie Mae Weems, and Willie Robert Middlebrook at The Art Institute of Chicago.” Art Institute of Chicago Museum Studies 24, no. 2 (1999): 249.
Stokstad, Marilyn and Michael W. Cothren. "The International Scene since 1950." In Art History. 4th ed. Vol. 2, 1111. Upper Saddle River, New Jersey: Prentice Hall, 2011.
Wright, Beryl J. "Back Talk: Recoding the Body." Callaloo 19, no. 2 (Spring, 1996): 397-413.

Black-and-white photographs
1988 works
1988 in art
1980s photographs